Seychelles competed at the 2013 World Championships in Athletics from August 10 to August 18 in Moscow, Russia.
A team of 1 athlete was
announced to represent the country
in the event.

Results

(q – qualified, NM – no mark, SB – season best)

Men

References

Nations at the 2013 World Championships in Athletics
2013 in Seychelles
Seychelles at the World Championships in Athletics